Lady Jukbang of the Juksan Bak clan, was among the descendants of Pasa of Silla and the first and primary wife of Gyeongsun of Silla, making her become the last Silla queen consort.

Controversy

In other theory, it was claimed that Jukbang was Gyeongsun's mother, but this make the result of mistranslation in Goryeo history.

However, Goryeosa, a Historical Book as the Records of Goryeo Dynasty Periods that completed in 1451 (1st year reign of Munjong of Joseon), so it must be long time after the falls of Silla Kingdom. Meanwhile, from Goryeosa's point, Gyeongsun was regarded and recorded as the last King of Silla, so his wife, Lady Jukbang, was also recorded as the last Queen of Silla. If based on Samguk Sagi, it was recorded if Gyeongsun's mother was the daughter of Heongang of Silla, Queen Mother Gyea (계아태후, 桂娥太后).

References

External links
경순왕(敬順王) on Encykorea .

Year of birth unknown
Royal consorts of Silla
Year of death unknown